Chemical waste is any excess, unusable, or unwanted chemical, especially those that cause damage to human health or the environment. Chemical waste may be classified as hazardous waste, non-hazardous waste, universal waste, or household hazardous waste. Hazardous waste is material that displays one or more of the following four characteristics: ignitability, corrosivity, reactivity, and toxicity. This information, along with chemical disposal requirements, is typically available on a chemical's Material Safety Data Sheet (MSDS). Radioactive waste requires special means of handling and disposal due to its radioactive properties. Biohazardous waste, though it often contains chemicals, is also handled differently.

Laboratory chemical waste in the US 

The U.S. Environmental Protection Agency (EPA) prohibits disposing of certain materials down drains. Therefore, when hazardous chemical waste is generated in a laboratory setting, it is usually stored on-site in an appropriate waste carboy where it is later collected and disposed of by a specialist contractor in order to meet safety, health, and legislative requirements. Many universities' Environment, Health, and Safety (EHS) divisions/departments serve this collection and oversight role.

Organic solvents and other organic waste is typically incinerated. Some chemical wastes are recycled, such as waste elemental mercury.

Laboratory waste containment

Packaging 
For packaging, chemical liquid waste containers are filled to no further than 75% capacity to allow for vapor expansion and to reduce potential spills which can occur from transporting or moving overfilled containers. Waste containers are constructed of material compatible with the stored hazardous waste and are often made of inert materials like Polypropylene (PP) or Polytetrafluoroethylene (PTFE). These containers are also constructed of mechanically robust materials in order to minimize leakage during storage or transit. 

In addition to the general packaging requirements mentioned above, precipitates, solids, and other non-fluid wastes are typically stored separate from liquid waste. Chemically contaminated glassware is disposed of separately from other chemical waste in containers that cannot be punctured by broken glass.

Labelling 
Containers are labelled with the group name from the chemical waste category and an itemized list of the contents. All chemicals or anything contaminated with chemicals pose a significant hazard. All waste especially Biohazardous or Hazardous Waste is appropriately packaged and labeled.

Storage 
Chemical waste containers are kept closed to prevent spillage, except when waste is added. Suitable containers are labelled in order to inform disposal specialists of the contents, as well as to prevent addition of incompatible chemicals. Liquid waste is stored in containers with secure screw-top or other lids that cannot be easily dislodged in transit. Solid waste is stored in various sturdy, chemically inert containers, such as large, sealed buckets or thick plastic bags. A secondary containment (e.g., flammable cabinet or large plastic bin, etc.) is used to capture spills and leaks from the primary container and segregate incompatible hazardous wastes, such as acids and bases.

Chemical compatibility guidelines 

Many chemicals react adversely when combined. Incompatible chemicals are therefore stored in separate areas of laboratories.

Acids are separated from alkalis, metals, cyanides, sulfides, azides, phosphides, and oxidizers, as when acids combine with these types of compounds, violent exothermic reactions can occur; in addition, some of these reactions produce flammable gases, which, combined with the heat produced, may cause explosions.In the case of cyanides, sulfides, azides, phosphides, etc., Toxic gases are also produced.

Oxidizers are separated from acids, organic materials, metals, reducing agents, and ammonia, as when oxidizers combine with these types of compounds, flammable and sometimes toxic compounds can be created. Oxidizers also increase the likelihood that any already present flammable material ignites, seen most readily in research laboratories with improper storage of organic solvents.

Environmental pollution

Pharmaceuticals

PPCPs

River pollution

Textile industry

The textile industry is one of the largest polluters in the globalized world of mostly free market dominated socioeconomic systems. Chemically polluted textile wastewater degrades the quality of the soil and water. The pollution comes from the type of conduct of chemical treatments used e.g., in pretreatment, dyeing, printing, and finishing operations that many or most market-driven companies use despite "eco-friendly alternatives". Textile industry wastewater is considered to be one the largest polluters of water and soil ecosystems, causing "carcinogenic, mutagenic, genotoxic, cytotoxic and allergenic threats to living organisms". The textile industry uses over 8000 chemicals in its supply chain, also pollutes the environment with large amounts of microplastics and has been identified in one review as the industry sector producing the largest amount of pollution.

A campaign of big clothing brands like Nike, Adidas and Puma to voluntarily reform their manufacturing supply chains to commit to achieving zero discharges of hazardous chemicals by 2020 (global goal) appears to have failed.

The textile industry also creates a lot of pollution that leads to externalities which can cause large economic problems. The problem usually occurs when there is no division of ownership rights. This means that the problem of pollution is largely caused because of incomplete information about which company pollutes and at what scale the damage was caused by the pollution.

Planetary boundary
A study by "Scienmag" defines a 'planetary boundary' for novel entities such as plastic and chemical pollution. The study reported that the boundary has been crossed.

Regulation of chemical waste 
Chemical waste may fall under regulations such as COSHH in the United Kingdom or the Clean Water Act and Resource Conservation and Recovery Act in the United States. In the U.S., the Environmental Protection Agency (EPA) and the Occupational Safety and Health Administration (OSHA), as well as state and local regulations, also regulate chemical use and disposal.

Chemical waste in Canadian aquaculture 

Chemical waste in oceans is becoming a major issue for marine life. There have been many studies conducted to try and prove the effects of chemicals in oceans. In Canada, many of the studies concentrated on the Atlantic provinces, where fishing and aquaculture are an important part of the economy. In New Brunswick, a study was done on sea urchins in an attempt to identify the effects of toxic and chemical waste on life beneath the ocean, specifically the waste from salmon farms. Sea urchins were used to check the levels of metals in the environment. Green sea urchins have been used as they are widely distributed, abundant in many locations, and easily accessible. By investigating the concentrations of metals in the green sea urchins, the impacts of chemicals from salmon aquaculture activity could be assessed and detected. Samples were taken at 25-metre intervals along a transect in the direction of the main tidal flow. The study found that there were impacts to at least 75 meters based on the intestine metal concentrations.

See also
Industrial waste
List of waste types
Municipal solid waste
Radioactive waste
Toxic waste
Waste management
Water pollution

References

Further reading

External links
Industrial Materials Recycling – US EPA

Waste
Water pollution